Ernest Barberolle (16 October 1861 – 5 September 1948) was a French coxswain who competed in the 1920 Summer Olympics. He won a silver medal, along with Gabriel Poix and Maurice Monney-Bouton in the coxed pair in Antwerp. Monney-Bouton was his son-in-law.

References

1861 births
1948 deaths
French male rowers
Olympic rowers of France
Rowers at the 1920 Summer Olympics
Olympic silver medalists for France
Olympic medalists in rowing
Medalists at the 1920 Summer Olympics
Coxswains (rowing)
European Rowing Championships medalists
20th-century French people